Wyoming Mail is a 1950 American Western film directed by Reginald Le Borg and starring Stephen McNally, Alexis Smith.

Plot
In 1869, when the railroad mail service is threatened by frequent bandit attacks, the government hires Steve Davis to infiltrate a gang in order to destroy it from inside.

Cast        
 Stephen McNally as Steve Davis
 Alexis Smith as Mary Williams
 Howard Da Silva as Cavanaugh 
 Ed Begley as Haynes
 Dan Riss as George Armstrong
 Roy Roberts as Charles De Haven
 Armando Silvestre as Indian Joe
 Whit Bissell as Sam 
 James Arness as Russell
 Richard Jaeckel as Nate
 Frankie Darro as Rufe 
 Felipe Turich as Pete
 Richard Egan as Beale 
 Gene Evans as Shep
 Frank Fenton as Gilson
 Emerson Treacy as Ben

Production

The railroad scenes were filmed on the Sierra Railroad in Tuolumne County, California.

References

External links
 

1950 films
American Western (genre) films
1950 Western (genre) films
Universal Pictures films
Films directed by Reginald Le Borg
1950s English-language films
1950s American films